Dissolvable tobacco is a tobacco product that dissolves in the mouth. Major tobacco manufacturers that sell dissolvable tobacco products include R. J. Reynolds Tobacco Company. Research into health effects of dissolvable and other new tobacco products was among the reasons of the establishment of the Tobacco Products Scientific Advisory Committee of the Food and Drug Administration in 2009.

Camel Dissolvables 
Camel Dissolvables were manufactured by R.J. Reynolds from 2009-2013 for the US market. The Camel Dissolvables line includes Camel Orbs, Camel Strips, and Camel Sticks, and were marketed as "a convenient alternative to cigarettes, and moist snuff for adult tobacco consumers." Reynolds said that the products "will not be positioned as a smoking cessation or reduced risk product".

Ingredients 
Camel Orbs contained finely grained tobacco mixed with "additives such as water, flavorants, binders, colorants, pH adjusters, buffering agents, fillers, disintegration aids, humectants, antioxidants, oral care ingredients, preservatives, additives derived from herbal or botanical sources, and mixtures thereof." Each pellet contained 1 milligram of nicotine, dissolving in the mouth in 10–15 minutes.  Camel Sticks product was a twisted stick the size of a toothpick that lasts in the mouth about 20–30 minutes, and contains 3.1 milligrams of nicotine. Camel Sticks were designed for insertion between the upper lip and gum. Camel Strips contained 0.6 milligrams of nicotine per strip. Camel Strips last 2–3 minutes on the tongue, administering nicotine through thin film drug delivery technology as used in Listerine PocketPacks breath freshening strips. A specific ingredient list naming all additives has not been made public for any of the Camel Dissolvables brands. The products were sold with two flavors, mellow or fresh/mint.

Ariva and Stonewall dissolvables 
From 2001 to 2012, Star Scientific manufactured two brands of dissolvable tobacco in the US, Ariva and Stonewall, both made with powdered compressed tobacco. They were said to be marketed as a means of "reducing toxins in tobacco so that adult consumers can have access to products that expose them to sharply reduced toxin levels" while still providing consumers with tobacco and nicotine. Star Scientific recommended Ariva brand for smokers and Stonewall for heavy smokers, defined as smokers who consume more than one pack a day, and users of other smokeless tobacco products such as snuff. Ariva was shown to have lower levels of brand has been shown to have a significantly reduced levels of one tobacco-specific lung carcinogen but many others were not assessed.

Ingredients 
Ariva, introduced in 2001, contained 1.5 milligrams of nicotine in each piece and dissolved in the mouth in 10–30 minutes. Stonewall, introduced in 2003  had more surface area than the Ariva pieces and contained 4 milligrams of nicotine per piece, with each piece dissolving in 10–30 minutes. Ariva was sold in Wintergreen flavor and Stonewall was sold with Natural, Wintergreen, and Java flavors. Other than tobacco and "other natural and artificial flavorings," including the non-sugar sweetener sucralose, Star Scientific did not list product ingredients.

Public health reactions

Underage consumption 
From the introduction of Ariva in 2001 there have been several public health claims that the dissolvable tobacco products pose a serious risk for unintentional poisonings in children and adolescents. Petitions from the American Cancer Society, Campaign for Tobacco-Free Kids, Attorneys General from 39 states, and multiple public health organizations were sent to the FDA asking for regulation of the Ariva brand and similar products.

A study on unintentional child poisonings from ingestion of tobacco products also assessed the toxicity of Camel Orbs, which "are of concern due to their discreet form, candy-like appearance, and added flavorings that may be attractive to young children." Reynolds and Star Scientific critiqued the study

Harm reduction 
A panel of public health researchers suggested that low nitrosamine smokeless tobacco products such as dissolvables could be a less harmful form of tobacco compared to cigarettes.

References 

Tobacco products